Wayne is a community within the Town of Drumheller, Alberta, Canada. It was previously a hamlet within the former Municipal District (MD) of Badlands No. 7 prior to the MD's amalgamation with the former City of Drumheller on January 1, 1998.

It is accessed via Highway 10X from Rosedale to the north through a  canyon in the badlands, across 11 bridges that span the Rosebud River.

Wayne is within Census Division No. 5 and was in the federal riding of Crowfoot.

Attractions 
Wayne was the site of several coal mines that were closed in the 1950s. It is host to a few historic sites, including the Rosedeer Hotel.

See also 

List of communities in Alberta

References 

Drumheller
Former hamlets in Alberta